Blam! Machinehead (released in the US as Machine Head) is a first-person shooter developed by Core Design and published by Virgin Interactive and Eidos Interactive, released for Sega Saturn, MS-DOS, and PlayStation in 1996.

Reception

Next Generation reviewed the Saturn version of the game, rating it three stars out of five. The magazine praised the graphics capabilities, but was critical of controls and lack of additional content.

Reviews
 GameFan #48 (vol. 4, issue 12) 1996 December
 PC Games - Jan, 1997
 GamePro - Jan, 1997
 GamePro - Feb, 1997
 Game Revolution - Jun 06, 2004
 Mean Machines (Nov, 1996)
 NowGamer (Oct 01, 1996)
 PC Zone (Aug 13, 2001)
 Joypad (Oct, 1996)
 Absolute Playstation (Dec, 1996)

References

External links
 Machine Head at GameFAQs
 Machine Head at Giant Bomb
 Blam! Machinehead at Sega Retro

1996 video games
Action video games
Core Design games
DOS games
Eidos Interactive games
First-person shooters
PlayStation (console) games
Sega Saturn games
Video games developed in the United Kingdom
Video games featuring female protagonists
Virgin Interactive games